Deyr County, also Dayyer County is in Bushehr province, Iran. The capital of the county is the city of Bandar-e Deyr. At the 2006 census, the county's population was 48,488 in 10,036 households. The following census in 2011 counted 52,523 people in 12,779 households. At the 2016 census, the county's population was 60,612 in 16,403 households.

Etymology
According to some historians Daiyir was named after a Jewish synagogue located in the heart of Daiyir.
The word Daiyir probably is derived from the Hebraic word (דייר) which means resident.

Overview
Deyr county is one of the nine counties in Bushehr Province, Iran. It has an area of 4000 km2.

Some historians believe, that Deyr county was exclusively inhabited by Jews, but by years the Muslims settled in the county, and a large proportion of Deyr county's Jews converted to Islam during the Safavid dynasty.
The population nowadays is Muslim; the Jewish inhabitants left the county in 1979. Persians and Arabs are the major races in Deyr, the citizens of Deyr speaks various forms of Persian languages including Persian and the local Deyr dialect. 
The capital of the county is Bandar Deyr, which is considered as a prominent harbor in the Persian Gulf.

Deyr County is bounded by the Persian Gulf to the west and south, Tangestan County & Dashti county to the north, Kangan County and Jam County to the east.

Deyr County has a climate that is mostly arid or semiarid. The highest point in the county is Mount Drang at 1,223 m.  Natural gas is extracted in the county. Wheat, tomatoes, corn, and other grains are grown.  There is a local fishing industry.

Deyr county includes three small towns & four villages, and several small islands such as Khan island (area, 800 hectares) and Nakhilu island (area, 75 hectares).

Climate and water: Deyr county has a very hot & humid summer, the temperature could reach 47 °C sometimes.
Mond River is the only river in Deyr county, and there is plenty of spring water.

Mammals and Birds: Deyr county has various mammal and bird species, such as camels, deer, foxes, rabbits, owls, hawks and flamingos, and caracals, striped hyenas, wolves and jackals rarely can be seen.
Mond natural reservation has an area of 464 km2, conserving local animals and plants.

Administrative divisions

The population history and structural changes of Deyr County's administrative divisions over three consecutive censuses are shown in the following table. The latest census shows three districts, six rural districts, and five cities.

Gazetteer of the Persian Gulf
Lorimer in his famous work, wrote that Daiyir consist partly of stone houses and partly of huts and is protected by a fort with towers, the population is about 5500 souls, including some Al-Nasur, some Bahrainis, and some Jews, but the bulk of the people claim to have come originally from Kufah.

References 

 پایگاه خبری دیر نت [Deyr net] (Deyr net)
 اطلس گیتاشناسی استان‌های ایران [Atlas Gitashenasi Ostanhai Iran] (Gitashenasi Province Atlas of Iran)

 

Counties of Bushehr Province